Derbyshire County Cricket Club in 1932 represents the cricket season when the English club Derbyshire had been playing for sixty one years. It was their thirty-fourth season in the County Championship and they won six matches to finish tenth

1932 season

Derbyshire played 28 games in the County Championship, and one match against the touring Indians on their first visit to England. Derbyshire won seven matches including the one against the tourists, but the season was marked by a number of draws and two abandoned matches.

A. W. Richardson was in his second season as captain in 1932. Denis Smith was top scorer with three centuries. Tommy Mitchell took most wickets. In the match against Essex at Chesterfield Garnet Lee and Stan Worthington achieved a 6th wicket partnership of 212 which remains a Derbyshire record.
 
Samuel Cadman's efforts at team-building brought two significant players into the club during the season – Charlie Elliott and Bill Copson. Elliott went on to play for around 20 years and made nearly 12,000 runs for the club. Copson stayed almost as long and took 1000 wickets. He marked his debut in the match against Surrey when he took the wicket of Andrew Sandham on his first ball. Thomas Higson who also joined in the season played three years before moving to Lancashire. William Wright playing two matches, and Stanley Walker playing one match made their only first class career appearances in the season.

Matches

{| class="wikitable" style="width:100%;"
|-
! style="background:#efefef;" colspan="6"| List of matches
|- style="background:#efefef;"
!No.
!Date
!V
!Result 
!Margin
!Notes
|- 
|1
|7 May 1932
| Lancashire  Old Trafford, Manchester 
 |bgcolor="#FF0000"|Lost 
| 72 runs
| Hopwood 5–35  
|- 
|2
| 14 May 1932
| Warwickshire  County Ground, Derby 
 |bgcolor="#00FF00"|Won 
| 123 runs
| T. B. Mitchell 7–48; T R Armstrong 5–27  
|- 
|3
| 18 May 1932
| Northamptonshire  County Ground, Northampton 
| style="background:#0f0;"|Won 
| 115 runs
| Bakewell 101; T. B. Mitchell 5–36 and 8–62 
|- 
|4
|  21 May 1932
| Yorkshire Queen's Park, Chesterfield 
 | Abandoned
|    
|- 
|5
| 25 May 1932
| Kent  Rutland Recreation Ground, Ilkeston 
 |bgcolor="#FFCC00"|Drawn
|
| Hardinge 5–19; L F Townsend 6–49   
|- 
|6
| 28 May 1932
|  Sussex   Queen's Park, Chesterfield 
 | Abandoned
|    
|- 
|7
| 1 Jun 1932
| Nottinghamshire  Trent Bridge, Nottingham 
| style="background:#f00;"|Lost 
 | Innings and 86 runs
| Keeton 108; Larwood 5–49  
|- 
|8
| 4 Jun 1932
| Hampshire Queen's Park, Chesterfield 
| style="background:#f00;"|Lost 
 | 2 wickets
| Kennedy 5–24; Bailey 5–42   
|- 
|9
| 8 Jun 1932
|  Surrey Kennington Oval 
| style="background:#f00;"|Lost 
 | 199 runs
|    
|- 
|10
| 11 Jun 1932
| Hampshire County Ground, Southampton 
| style="background:#f00;"|Lost 
 | 6 wickets
| D Smith 103; Arnold 100; Mead 104; W H Copson 5–48  
|- 
|11
| 15 Jun 1932
 | Kent  Angel Ground, Tonbridge
| style="background:#f00;"|Lost 
 | 23 runs
| Freeman 6–128 and 6–85; W H Copson 5–40   
|- 
|12
| 18 Jun 1932
| Leicestershire Queen's Park, Chesterfield 
| style="background:#fc0;"|Drawn
 |
| N Armstrong 113; Geary 6–40; T S Worthington 5–43   
|- 
|13
| 22 Jun 1932
| Middlesex   County Ground, Derby 
| style="background:#fc0;"|Drawn
 |
| Hearne 106; Hendren 119; H Storer 170; D Smith 107   
|- 
|14
| 25 Jun 1932
| Nottinghamshire  Rutland Recreation Ground, Ilkeston 
| style="background:#0f0;"|Won 
 | 7 wickets
| Keeton 118; A V Pope 6–54   
|- 
|15
| 29 Jun 1932
|  Surrey Queen's Park, Chesterfield 
| style="background:#fc0;"|Drawn
 |
| Fender 5–71; Brown 6–45  
|- 
|16
| 2 Jul 1932
| Essex   County Ground, Leyton 
| style="background:#fc0;"|Drawn
 |
|D Smith 111; Crawley 138; T Smith 5–128; GM Lee 7–67   
|- 
|17
| 6 Jul 1932
| Lancashire  Park Road Ground, Buxton 
| style="background:#f00;"|Lost 
 | 185 runs
| Tyldesley 134; L F Townsend 7–80 and 5–68; Iddon 5–54 and 5–31; Sibbles 5–42   
|- 
|18
| 9 Jul 1932
| Essex   Queen's Park, Chesterfield 
| style="background:#0f0;"|Won 
 | Innings and 171 runs
| GM Lee 130; L F Townsend 5–33 and 6–32   
|- 
|19
| 16 Jul 1932
| SomersetCounty Ground, Derby 
| style="background:#fc0;"|Drawn
 |
| J Lee 5–45  
|- 
|20
| 27 Jul 1932
|  Sussex   County Ground, Derby 
| style="background:#fc0;"|Drawn
 |
| Parks 172   
|- 
|21
| 30 Jul 1932
| Warwickshire Edgbaston, Birmingham 
| style="background:#fc0;"|Drawn
 |
| T. B. Mitchell 6–79; Wyatt 5–24; Paine 5–49 and 5–79   
|- 
|22
| 3 Aug 1932
|  Worcestershire County Ground, New Road, Worcester 
| style="background:#fc0;"|Drawn
 |
|    
|- 
|23
| 6 Aug 1932
| Yorkshire Headingley, Leeds 
| style="background:#f00;"|Lost 
 | Innings and 89 runs
| Sutcliffe 182; Leyland 113; T S Worthington 102; Verity 6–32 and 5–37; A V Pope 6–116  
|- 
|24
| 10 Aug 1932
| Middlesex    Lord's Cricket Ground, St John's Wood 
| style="background:#fc0;"|Drawn
 |
| Killick 128; L F Townsend 153; T. B. Mitchell 5–162; Peebles 6–104   
|- 
|25
| 13 Aug 1932
| Worcestershire   County Ground, Derby 
| style="background:#fc0;"|Drawn
 |
| Gibbons 109; T. B. Mitchell 6–94   
|- 
|26
| 17 Aug 1932
| Indian cricket team in England in 1932  Rutland Recreation Ground, Ilkeston 
| style="background:#0f0;"|Won 
 | 9 runs
| Jaoomal 101; T. B. Mitchell 5–77 and 5–71; L F Townsend 5–78   
|- 
|27
| 20 Aug 1932
| Northamptonshire  Queen's Park, Chesterfield 
| style="background:#0f0;"|Won 
 | Innings and 123 runs
| Cox 7–91; L F Townsend 7–37   
|- 
|28
| 24 Aug 1932
| SomersetCounty Ground, Taunton 
| style="background:#fc0;"|Drawn
 |
| F Lee 145   
|- 
|29
| 27 Aug 1932
| Leicestershire Bath Grounds, Ashby-de-la-Zouch 
| style="background:#0f0;"|Won 
|36 runs
| N Armstrong 117; Marlow 7–90; T. B. Mitchell 6–53 and 6–106  
|- 
|

Statistics

County Championship batting averages

County Championship bowling averages

Wicket-keeper

H Elliott Catches 59 Stumping 14

See also
Derbyshire County Cricket Club seasons
1932 English cricket season

References

1932 in English cricket
Derbyshire County Cricket Club seasons
English cricket seasons in the 20th century